The Most Rev. Robert Miranda (born 10 April 1952) is the first bishop of the Roman Catholic Diocese of Gulbarga. He was born in Mangalore in 1952 and was educated at local Catholic schools and St. Aloysius College, Mangalore He was ordained as a priest on 4 May 1978 and as a bishop on 18 August 2005.

See also

References

People from Kalaburagi
Living people
21st-century Roman Catholic bishops in India
1952 births